A Land Imagined is a 2018 neo-noir mystery thriller film written and directed by Yeo Siew Hua. A Singapore-France-Netherlands co-production, the film tells the story of a police investigator who uncovers the truth behind the disappearance of a construction worker.

The film premiered in competition on 7 August 2018, at the 71st Locarno Film Festival, and won the top prize of the festival, the Golden Leopard. At Locarno, Yeo also won the Junior Jury award and a Special Mention award. In December 2018, A Land Imagined played in competition at the 29th Singapore International Film Festival, where it was named Best Asian Feature Film by a jury led by Hong Kong director Stanley Kwan. It is the first time a Singaporean film has won the award. The film was released in Singapore theatres on February 21, 2019. It was selected as the Singaporean entry for the Best International Feature Film at the 92nd Academy Awards, but it was not nominated.

Plot 
The film revolves around Lok, a police officer who is investigating the disappearance of a Chinese migrant worker working at a land reclamation site. The investigation leads him to the disappearance of another Bengali worker, who was on good terms with the missing worker. As he retraces the steps of the missing worker, Lok gets a sensing of the plight of these workers as they work for an unscrupulous employer.

Cast 
 Peter Yu as Lok
 Luna Kwok as Mindy
 Liu Xiaoyi as Wang
 Jack Tan as Jason
 Ishtiaque Zico as Ajit

Reception 
On Metacritic, the film has a weighted average score of 59 out of 100, based on 7 critics, indicating "mixed or average reviews".

Awards and nominations

See also
 List of submissions to the 92nd Academy Awards for Best International Feature Film
 List of Singaporean submissions for the Academy Award for Best International Feature Film

References

External links 
 
 
 A Land Imagined at Locarno Film Festival
 A Land Imagined at Rotten Tomatoes

2018 films
2018 thriller films
2010s Mandarin-language films
2010s English-language films
French thriller films
Dutch thriller films
Singaporean multilingual films
2018 multilingual films
2010s French films
2010s Bengali-language films
French multilingual films
Dutch multilingual films